Lyudmila Marsovna Biktasheva (Cyrillic: Людмила Марсовна Бикташева; born 25 July 1974 in Kamensk-Uralsky) is a Russian athlete competing in the long-distance events. She represented her country at the 2000 Summer Olympics in the 10,000 metres finishing 13th in the final. She won the bronze medal in the same event at the 2002 European Championships.

Competition record

Personal bests
Outdoor
5000 metres – 15:22.98 (Yokohama 2000)
10,000 metres – 31:04.00 (Munich 2002)
10 kilometres – 32:04 (Cape Elizabeth 2008)
15 kilometres – 49:42 (Bristol 2001)
Half marathon – 1:10:31 (Vilamoura 2003)
Half marathon – 1:10:31 (Bristol 2001)
Marathon – 2:29:57 (Baltimore 2011)
Indoor
3000 metres – 9:20.0 (Yekaterinburg 1998)

See also
List of European Athletics Championships medalists (women)

References

1974 births
Living people
People from Kamensk-Uralsky
Sportspeople from Sverdlovsk Oblast
Russian female long-distance runners
Russian female marathon runners
Olympic female long-distance runners
Olympic athletes of Russia
Athletes (track and field) at the 2000 Summer Olympics
Competitors at the 2001 Goodwill Games
World Athletics Championships athletes for Russia
Russian Athletics Championships winners
European Athletics Championships medalists